"Bouncing Off Clouds" is a song written and recorded by Tori Amos. It was the first European and second American single from her album American Doll Posse. The song was released in the US to Triple A Radio in early August.

Music video
The music video for "Bouncing off Clouds" is a variation of the music video for "Big Wheel", a slide show of photographs taken by Blaise Reutersward for Amos' album, American Doll Posse. This music video uses slightly different images of Amos, interspersed with images of clouds. The music video was released to Yahoo! music on October 3, 2007. As with "Big Wheel", a contest was held for a fan-made video of "Bouncing Off Clouds" with Epic/Sony providing green screen footage of Amos playing on a Rhodes piano and a Wurlitzer.

Charts
The sole ranking for "Bouncing off Clouds" was placing at #50 on the Italian Top 50 Downloads chart. The single failed to chart on either the Billboard Hot 100 in the U.S. nor the UK Singles Chart. It had no physical release.

Performances
In support of this second US single from American Doll Posse, Amos performed "Bouncing Off Clouds" on a variety of television programs:
 The Graham Norton Show on May 10, 2007
 The Tonight Show with Jay Leno on October 1, 2007
 The Late Late Show with Craig Ferguson on October 11, 2007

References

2007 singles
Tori Amos songs
Songs written by Tori Amos
Epic Records singles
2006 songs